Park Lane by CMP is a shopping center located West District, Taichung, Taiwan. The shopping center is jointly operated by the CMP Group and Eslite Bookstore.

History 
The building was first built as the Guangsan Dadiwang Building (廣三大地王大樓) in 1996. Within the building, the Guangsan Group operated a shopping center and a parking lot within the building in a design similar to the current layout. However, in 2005, the Guansan Group found itself in financial trouble, and in the ensuing legal procedures, the Dadiwang Building was seized due to tax evasion. The CMP Group acquired the building for $1.7 billion NTD during a court auction and decided to operate a shopping center in conjunction with Eslite Bookstore. The shopping center reopened in May 2008.

Overview 
Park Lane by CMP is located directly adjacent to Calligraphy Greenway, a major linear park. The shopping center has 15 floors above ground and 2 below, out of which floors 4 to 11 are parking spaces. Eslite Bookstore occupies the entire 3rd floor along with a store on the 2nd floor dedicated to stationery. The B1 floor is dedicated to dining.

One of the defining features of the building is its large green walls present in both the interior and exterior of the building. The green wall on the exterior features the Madagascar periwinkle plant and wraps around the entire building, while the interior green wall spans several floors. CMP Group claims that the walls absorb 200 kg of carbon dioxide and release 150 kg of oxygen a day. At its completion, the exterior green wall was the largest of its type within Asia.

References 

Shopping malls established in 1996
Shopping malls established in 2008
Shopping malls in Taichung
Buildings and structures in Taichung
Tourist attractions in Taichung